Anna Christina Charlotta Edelheim (3 January 1845, Helsinki – 25 May 1902, Helsinki), was a Finnish journalist. She is considered to be one of the first female journalists in Finland.

Life
Anna Edelheim was born to politician Paul Henrik Edelheim and Emilia Christina af Brunér and sister of architect Frans Edvard Edelheim. She was active as a journalist for the Finska Veckobladet in 1886-1888. As such, she has been referred to as the first female journalist in Finland. She foremost focused on women's rights and freedom of religion.

Works 

 Fremlingens dotter : en sommarsaga från en finsk insjö, af -ei-. Helsingfors 1878
 I brytningstid : samtal i språkfrågan af x.?. Söderström, Helsingfors 1897
 Hemkomsten, af -im. Fosterländsk läsning. Serie 2 N:o 2. Stockholm 1903

References

 kansallisbiografia Suomen kansallisbiografia  (National Biography of Finland)

1845 births
1902 deaths
19th-century Finnish women writers
19th-century Finnish journalists
Finnish women journalists
19th-century women journalists